USS R-11 (SS-88) was an R-class coastal and harbor defense submarine of the United States Navy.

Construction and commissioning
R-11′s keel was laid down by the Fore River Shipbuilding Company in Quincy, Massachusetts, on March 18, 1918. She was launched on March 21, 1919, sponsored by Miss Dorothy Batchelder, and commissioned on September 5, 1919.

Service history

1919–1930
R-11 remained inactive at Boston, Massachusetts, with a crew of only two men for two months following commissioning. Then, with the new year 1920, she commenced training cruises along the New England coast and, in April, to Bermuda. On completion of training cruises, she returned to New London, Connecticut, whence she sailed on May 31 for the Pacific. Given hull classification symbol SS-88 in July, she arrived at Pearl Harbor on August 4. Homeported there for the next ten years, she conducted operations in the Hawaiian area, searched for missing ships, including the seagoing tug Conestoga (AT-54), and planes; participated in tactical exercises; and engaged in fleet maneuvers.

1931–1946
On December 12, 1930, the R-boat departed Pearl Harbor for the last time and steamed east to San Diego, California, whence she continued on through the Panama Canal, to New London. She returned to that Thames River base February 9, 1931 and for the remainder of the decade served as a training ship primarily for the Submarine School at New London and occasionally for NROTC units in the southern New England area. Transferred to Key West, Florida, on June 1, 1941, R-11 continued her training ship duties throughout the remainder of her career.

Decommissioned September 5, 1945, R-11 was struck from the Naval Vessel Register on October 11, 1945; sold to Macey O. Smith Miami, Florida, March 13, 1946; and scrapped in 1948.

References

External links
 

United States R-class submarines
World War II submarines of the United States
Ships built in Quincy, Massachusetts
1919 ships